Antanas Šurna (27 March 1939 – 19 May 2014) was a Lithuanian stage and movie actor. He has appeared in over 100 movies and 50 plays. He is thought to be one of the most successful actors in Lithuania. His career began during the late 1960s. He won many awards during his 40-year career.

Šurna died suddenly from cardiac arrest in Vilnius, Lithuania, aged 75.

Filmography

References

1939 births
2014 deaths
20th-century Lithuanian male actors
Lithuanian male film actors
Lithuanian male stage actors
21st-century Lithuanian male actors